This is a list of cantons of Luxembourg by highest point, in order of descending altitude.

See also 
 List of cantons of Luxembourg by area
 List of cantons of Luxembourg by lowest point
 List of cantons of Luxembourg by population
 List of cantons of Luxembourg by population density

Highest point